Naciri is a Moroccan Arabic surname. Notable people with the surname include:

 Mohamed El Mekki Naciri 
 Junas Naciri (born 1973), Dutch retired footballer
 Khalid Naciri (born 1946), Moroccan politician
 Mohammad Naciri (born 1973), Moroccan United Nations official
 Mohamed Taieb Naciri (1939–2012), Moroccan lawyer and politician
 Said Naciri (born 1960), Moroccan actor, comedian and producer
 Youssef Naciri (born 1993), Moroccan footballer
 Hassan Naciri, Moroccan public figure.

References 

Surnames of Moroccan origin